The placenta is a temporary embryonic and later fetal organ that begins developing from the blastocyst shortly after implantation. It plays critical roles in facilitating nutrient, gas and waste exchange between the physically separate maternal and fetal circulations, and is an important endocrine organ, producing hormones that regulate both maternal and fetal physiology during pregnancy. The placenta connects to the fetus via the umbilical cord, and on the opposite aspect to the maternal uterus in a species-dependent manner. In humans, a thin layer of maternal decidual (endometrial) tissue comes away with the placenta when it is expelled from the uterus following birth (sometimes incorrectly referred to as the 'maternal part' of the placenta). Placentas are a defining characteristic of placental mammals, but are also found in marsupials and some non-mammals with varying levels of development.

Mammalian placentas probably first evolved about 150 million to 200 million years ago. The protein syncytin, found in the outer barrier of the placenta (the syncytiotrophoblast) between mother and fetus, has a certain RNA signature in its genome that has led to the hypothesis that it originated from an ancient retrovirus: essentially a virus that helped pave the transition from egg-laying to live-birth.

The word placenta  comes from the Latin word for a type of cake, from Greek πλακόεντα/πλακοῦντα plakóenta/plakoúnta, accusative of πλακόεις/πλακούς plakóeis/plakoús, "flat, slab-like", with reference to its round, flat appearance in humans. The classical plural is placentae, but the form placentas is more common in modern English.

Evolution and phylogenetic diversity
The placenta has evolved independently multiple times, probably starting in fish, where it originated multiple times, including the genus Poeciliopsis. Placentation has also evolved in some reptiles.

The mammalian placenta evolved more than 100 million years ago and was a critical factor in the explosive diversification of placental mammals. Although all mammalian placentas have the same functions, there are important differences in structure and function in different groups of mammals. For example, human, bovine, equine and canine placentas are very different at both the gross and the microscopic levels. Placentas of these species also differ in their ability to provide maternal immunoglobulins to the fetus.

Structure 
Placental mammals, including humans, have a chorioallantoic placenta that forms from the chorion and allantois. In humans, the placenta averages 22 cm (9 inch) in length and 2–2.5 cm (0.8–1 inch) in thickness, with the center being the thickest, and the edges being the thinnest. It typically weighs approximately 500 grams (just over 1 lb).  It has a dark reddish-blue or crimson color. It connects to the fetus by an umbilical cord of approximately 55–60 cm (22–24 inch) in length, which contains two umbilical arteries and one umbilical vein. The umbilical cord inserts into the chorionic plate (has an eccentric attachment). Vessels branch out over the surface of the placenta and further divide to form a network covered by a thin layer of cells. This results in the formation of villous tree structures. On the maternal side, these villous tree structures are grouped into lobules called cotyledons. In humans, the placenta usually has a disc shape, but size varies vastly between different mammalian species.

The placenta occasionally takes a form in which it comprises several distinct parts connected by blood vessels. The parts, called lobes, may number two, three, four, or more. Such placentas are described as bilobed/bilobular/bipartite, trilobed/trilobular/tripartite, and so on. If there is a clearly discernible main lobe and auxiliary lobe, the latter is called a succenturiate placenta. Sometimes the blood vessels connecting the lobes get in the way of fetal presentation during labor, which is called vasa previa.

Gene and protein expression 

About 20,000 protein coding genes are expressed in human cells and 70% of these genes are expressed in the normal mature placenta. Some 350 of these genes are more specifically expressed in the placenta and fewer than 100 genes are highly placenta specific. The corresponding specific proteins are mainly expressed in trophoblasts and have functions related to pregnancy. Examples of proteins with elevated expression in placenta compared to other organs and tissues are PEG10 and the cancer testis antigen PAGE4 and expressed in cytotrophoblasts, CSH1 and KISS1 expressed in syncytiotrophoblasts, and PAPPA2 and PRG2 expressed in extravillous trophoblasts.

Physiology

Development

The placenta begins to develop upon implantation of the blastocyst into the maternal endometrium, very early on in pregnancy at about week 4.

The outer layer of the late blastocyst, is formed of trophoblasts, cells that form the outer layer of the placenta. This outer layer is divided into two further layers: the underlying cytotrophoblast layer and the overlying syncytiotrophoblast layer. The syncytiotrophoblast is a multinucleated continuous cell layer that covers the surface of the placenta. It forms as a result of differentiation and fusion of the underlying cytotrophoblasts, a process that continues throughout placental development. The syncytiotrophoblast contributes to the barrier function of the placenta.

The placenta grows throughout pregnancy. Development of the maternal blood supply to the placenta is complete by the end of the first trimester of pregnancy week 14 (DM).

Placental circulation

Maternal placental circulation
In preparation for implantation of the blastocyst, the endometrium undergoes decidualization. Spiral arteries in the decidua are remodeled so that they become less convoluted and their diameter is increased. The increased diameter and straighter flow path both act to increase maternal blood flow to the placenta. There is relatively high pressure as the maternal blood fills intervillous space through these spiral arteries which bathe the fetal villi in blood, allowing an exchange of gases to take place. In humans and other hemochorial placentals, the maternal blood comes into direct contact with the fetal chorion, though no fluid is exchanged. As the pressure decreases between pulses, the deoxygenated blood flows back through the endometrial veins.

Maternal blood flow begins between days 5–12, and is approximately 600–700 ml/min at term.

Fetoplacental circulation

Deoxygenated fetal blood passes through umbilical arteries to the placenta. At the junction of umbilical cord and placenta, the umbilical arteries branch radially to form chorionic arteries. Chorionic arteries, in turn, branch into cotyledon arteries. In the villi, these vessels eventually branch to form an extensive arterio-capillary-venous system, bringing the fetal blood extremely close to the maternal blood; but no intermingling of fetal and maternal blood occurs ("placental barrier").

Endothelin and prostanoids cause vasoconstriction in placental arteries, while nitric oxide causes vasodilation. On the other hand, there is no neural vascular regulation, and catecholamines have only little effect.

The fetoplacental circulation is vulnerable to persistent hypoxia or intermittent hypoxia and reoxygenation, which can lead to generation of excessive free radicals. This may contribute to pre-eclampsia and other pregnancy complications. It is proposed that melatonin plays a role as an antioxidant in the placenta.

This begins at day 17–22.

Birth

Placental expulsion begins as a physiological separation from the wall of the uterus. The period from just after the child is born until just after the placenta is expelled is called the "third stage of labor". The placenta is usually expelled within 15–30 minutes of birth.

Placental expulsion can be managed actively, for example by giving oxytocin via intramuscular injection followed by cord traction to assist in delivering the placenta. Alternatively, it can be managed expectantly, allowing the placenta to be expelled without medical assistance. Blood loss and the risk of postpartum bleeding may be reduced in women offered active management of the third stage of labour, however there may be adverse effects and more research is necessary.

The habit is to cut the cord immediately after birth, but it is theorised that there is no medical reason to do this; on the contrary, it is theorised that not cutting the cord helps the baby in its adaptation to extrauterine life, especially in preterm infants.

Microbiome

The placenta is traditionally thought to be sterile, but recent research suggests that a resident, non-pathogenic, and diverse population of microorganisms may be present in healthy tissue. However, whether these microbes exist or are clinically important is highly controversial and is the subject of active research.

Functions

Nutrition and gas exchange
The placenta intermediates the transfer of nutrients between mother and fetus. The perfusion of the intervillous spaces of the placenta with maternal blood allows the transfer of nutrients and oxygen from the mother to the fetus and the transfer of waste products and carbon dioxide back from the fetus to the maternal blood. Nutrient transfer to the fetus can occur via both active and passive transport. Placental nutrient metabolism was found to play a key role in limiting the transfer of some nutrients. Adverse pregnancy situations, such as those involving maternal diabetes or obesity, can increase or decrease levels of nutrient transporters in the placenta potentially resulting in overgrowth or restricted growth of the fetus.

Excretion
Waste products excreted from the fetus such as urea, uric acid, and creatinine are transferred to the maternal blood by diffusion across the placenta.

Immunity
The placenta functions as a selective barrier between maternal and fetal cells, preventing maternal blood, proteins and microbes (including bacteria and most viruses) from crossing the maternal-fetal barrier.
Deterioration in placental functioning, referred to as placental insufficiency, may be related to mother-to-child transmission of some infectious diseases.
A very small number of viruses including rubella virus, Zika virus and cytomegalovirus (CMV) can travel across the placental barrier, generally taking advantage of conditions at certain gestational periods as the placenta develops. CMV and Zika travel from the maternal bloodstream via placental cells to the fetal bloodstream.

Beginning as early as 13 weeks of gestation, and increasing linearly, with the largest transfer occurring in the third trimester, IgG antibodies can pass through the human placenta, providing protection to the fetus in utero. 
This passive immunity lingers for several months after birth, providing the newborn with a carbon copy of the mother's long-term humoral immunity to see the infant through the crucial first months of extrauterine life. IgM antibodies, because of their larger size, cannot cross the placenta, one reason why infections acquired during pregnancy can be particularly hazardous for the fetus.

Endocrine function
 The first hormone released by the placenta is called the human chorionic gonadotropin (hCG) hormone. This is responsible for stopping the process at the end of menses when the corpus luteum ceases activity and atrophies. If hCG did not interrupt this process, it would lead to spontaneous abortion of the fetus. The corpus luteum also produces and releases progesterone and estrogen, and hCG stimulates it to increase the amount that it releases. hCG is the indicator of pregnancy that pregnancy tests look for. These tests will work when menses has not occurred or after implantation has happened on days seven to ten. hCG may also have an anti-antibody effect, protecting it from being rejected by the mother's body. hCG also assists the male fetus by stimulating the testes to produce testosterone, which is the hormone needed to allow the sex organs of the male to grow.
 Progesterone helps the embryo implant by assisting passage through the fallopian tubes. It also affects the fallopian tubes and the uterus by stimulating an increase in secretions necessary for fetal nutrition. Progesterone, like hCG, is necessary to prevent spontaneous abortion because it prevents contractions of the uterus and is necessary for implantation.
 Estrogen is a crucial hormone in the process of proliferation. This involves the enlargement of the breasts and uterus, allowing for growth of the fetus and production of milk. Estrogen is also responsible for increased blood supply towards the end of pregnancy through vasodilation. The levels of estrogen during pregnancy can increase so that they are thirty times what a non-pregnant woman mid-cycles estrogen level would be.
 Human placental lactogen (hPL) is a hormone used in pregnancy to develop fetal metabolism and general growth and development. Human placental lactogen works with growth hormone to stimulate Insulin-like growth factor production and regulating intermediary metabolism. In the fetus, hPL acts on lactogenic receptors to modulate embryonic development, metabolism and stimulate production of IGF, insulin, surfactant and adrenocortical hormones. hPL values increase with multiple pregnancies, intact molar pregnancy, diabetes and Rh incompatibility. They are decreased with toxemia, choriocarcinoma, and Placental insufficiency.

Immunological barrier

The placenta and fetus may be regarded as a foreign body inside the mother and must be protected from the normal immune response of the mother that would cause it to be rejected. The placenta and fetus are thus treated as sites of immune privilege, with immune tolerance.

For this purpose, the placenta uses several mechanisms :
It secretes neurokinin B-containing phosphocholine molecules. This is the same mechanism used by parasitic nematodes to avoid detection by the immune system of their host.
There is presence of small lymphocytic suppressor cells in the fetus that inhibit maternal cytotoxic T cells by inhibiting the response to interleukin 2.

However, the placental barrier is not the sole means of evading the immune system, as foreign fetal cells also persist in the maternal circulation, on the other side of the placental barrier.

Other
The placenta also provides a reservoir of blood for the fetus, delivering blood to it in case of hypotension and vice versa, comparable to a capacitor.

Clinical significance

Numerous pathologies can affect the placenta.

 Placenta accreta, when the placenta implants too deeply, all the way to the actual muscle of uterine wall (without penetrating it)
 Placenta praevia, when the placement of the placenta is too close to or blocks the cervix
 Placental abruption, premature detachment of the placenta
 Placentitis, inflammation of the placenta, such as by TORCH infections.

Society and culture
The placenta often plays an important role in various cultures, with many societies conducting rituals regarding its disposal. In the Western world, the placenta is most often incinerated.

Some cultures bury the placenta for various reasons. The Māori of New Zealand traditionally bury the placenta from a newborn child to emphasize the relationship between humans and the earth. Likewise, the Navajo bury the placenta and umbilical cord at a specially chosen site, particularly if the baby dies during birth. In Cambodia and Costa Rica, burial of the placenta is believed to protect and ensure the health of the baby and the mother. If a mother dies in childbirth, the Aymara of Bolivia bury the placenta in a secret place so that the mother's spirit will not return to claim her baby's life.

The placenta is believed by some communities to have power over the lives of the baby or its parents. The Kwakiutl of British Columbia bury girls' placentas to give the girl skill in digging clams, and expose boys' placentas to ravens to encourage future prophetic visions. In Turkey, the proper disposal of the placenta and umbilical cord is believed to promote devoutness in the child later in life. In Transylvania and Japan, interaction with a disposed placenta is thought to influence the parents' future fertility.

Several cultures believe the placenta to be or have been alive, often a relative of the baby. Nepalese think of the placenta as a friend of the baby; the orang Asli and Malay populations in Malay Peninsula regard it as the baby's older sibling. Native Hawaiians believe that the placenta is a part of the baby, and traditionally plant it with a tree that can then grow alongside the child.  Various cultures in Indonesia, such as Javanese and Malay, believe that the placenta has a spirit and needs to be buried outside the family house. Some Malays would bury the baby's placenta with a pencil (if it is a boy) or a needle and thread (if it is a girl).

In some cultures, the placenta is eaten, a practice known as placentophagy. In some eastern cultures, such as China, the dried placenta (ziheche , literally "purple river car") is thought to be a healthful restorative and is sometimes used in preparations of traditional Chinese medicine and various health products.  The practice of human placentophagy has become a more recent trend in western cultures and is not without controversy; its practice being considered cannibalism is debated.

Some cultures have alternative uses for placenta that include the manufacturing of cosmetics, pharmaceuticals and food.

Additional images

See also 
Choriovitelline placenta
Caul
Zygote
Pregnancy in fish

References

External links 

 The placenta-specific proteome at the Human Protein Atlas
 The Placenta, gynob.com, with quotes from Williams Obstetrics, 18th Edition, F. Gary Cunningham, M.D., Paul C. MacDonald, M.D., Norman F. Grant, M.D., Appleton & Lange, Publishers.

Vertebrate developmental biology
Embryology of cardiovascular system
Organs (anatomy)
Reproductive system
Microbiomes
Human female endocrine system